Hujjat al-Islam Professor Khwaja Muhammad Latif Ansari (1887-1979), alternatively spelled Muḥammad Latīf Anṣārī, was a 20th-century Shia Muslim scholar, poet, historian, and cleric from Pakistan.  

Ansari was born in British India, but migrated to the newly formed Pakistan immediately after it achieved independence. In Pakistan, he took up residence in the city of Wazirabad.  He spent much of his life in Kenya, where he is remembered to this day by the Shia community for bringing active and organized Shi'ism to the country. Ansari spent the last ten years of his life partially paralysed. Although he was a prolific author, many of his books were not published.

Years in Pakistan
Ansari was a member of the Shi'i scholarly community, both in the years leading up to Partition in British India and over the first decade of Pakistani independence. He served as the Secretary-General of the Punjab Shia Conference (PuSC) under British rule in the 1940s, struggling against the passivity of the organization and its inability to extract annual membership dues and regularly publish its weekly journal, Razâkâr. Migrating to Wazirabad after Partition in 1947, Ansari was elected as the first Secretary-General of the All-Pakistan Shia Conference (APSC) in a lively contest.

Ansari was intensely concerned with the state of Shi'i tabligh in these years, writing and speaking extensively on what this phenomenon's implications for the future of the Shi'ism would be. In one article from March 1956, he contends the following:

Migration to Kenya
Ansari left South Asia for Kenya in the 1950s, fulfilling his dream of preaching to distant, foreign Shi'i communities that he mentions in the above quote. He was already a reputed cleric by that time, but nevertheless joined a number of scholars coming from South Asia into the relatively unheard of Shia community of Kenya. After becoming a resident alim there, Ansari helped the community to become large and prosperous as it is today. He is remembered to this day in the country for an address he delivered at the Arusha Conference in December 1958, in which he emphasized the need for tabligh. A large amount of his efforts were focused on the Khoja community.

Legacy
Scholars in Canada, United States, Iran, Pakistan, and Kenya, among other places, have used his works as source material.

Publications

Most of his writings are in Urdu. His works today survive in several university catalogs and libraries.

Ansari is also mentioned as a source in "A Restatement of the History of Islam and Muslims" by Sayyid Ali Ashgar Razwy.

Some of his publications are as follows:
 Islam Aur Musalmano Ki Tareekh (The History of Islam and Muslims)
Tārīk̲h̲-i Ḥasan Mujtabá (History of Al-Hasan Al-Mujtaba)
Shazada-e-Yathrib Alam-e-Hijrat Mein
 Ma'arejal Irfan
 Karbalā kī kahānī, Qurʼān kī zabānī (The Story of Karbala in the words of the Qur'an).

See also
 Islam
 Shia Islam in Pakistan
 Shia Islam in Kenya
 Khoja

References

External links
 WorldCat Profile
 Library of Congress File
 VIAF
 University of Chicago Tārīk̲h̲-i Ḥasan Mujtabá File
 OpenLibrary.org Profile
 Books in University of Wisconsin-Madison Catalog
 OCLC Classify
 Islam Aur Musalmano Ki Tareekh at ziyaraat.net
 Tārīk̲h̲-i Ḥasan Mujtabá on Google Books
 Highlights of Bilal Muslim Mission of Tanzania (1965 - 1986)
 Synopsis of the Khoja Shia Ithna Asheri
 E-Book of 12 Personalities

Shia scholars of Islam
Pakistani scholars
Muhajir people
Najjarite people
Shia Islam in Pakistan
Shia fiqh
Pakistani Shia clerics
1887 births
1979 deaths
Pakistani emigrants to Kenya
People from Wazirabad